refers to two railway stations in Nishinomiya, Hyōgo, Japan:
 Nishinomiya Station (JR West)
 Nishinomiya Station (Hanshin)